In heraldry, an avellane cross is a form of cross which resembles four hazel filberts in their husks or cases, joined together at the great end. The term comes from the Latin name for the hazel, originally Nux avellana. It was fairly rare in English heraldry.

References

Crosses in heraldry